The 509th Tactical Fighter Squadron is an inactive United States Air Force unit. It was last assigned to the 10th Tactical Fighter Wing at RAF Alconbury, England, where it was inactivated on 30 December 1992.

The squadron was first activated as the 624th Bombardment Squadron in 1943, changing to the 509th Fighter-Bomber Squadron a few months later.  After training in the United States, it moved to England in March 1944, helping prepare for Operation Overlord by attacking targets in France.   Following D-Day, the squadron moved to the continent, providing close air support for Allied forces.  The squadron earned a Distinguished Unit Citation and was cited in the Order of the Day by the Belgian Army.  After V-E Day The squadron returned to the United States and was inactivated at the port of embarkation.

The squadron was activated again in 1952, when it replaced an Air National Guard squadron that had been mobilized for the Korean War.  It trained for fighter bomber operations until inactivating in 1958.  A year later, it was activated in the Philippines as the 509th Fighter-Interceptor Squadron with an air defense mission.  It deployed interceptor aircraft to Taiwan and from 1962 to 1969 maintained detachments in Vietnam.

The squadron was inactivated in 1970, but returned in England in 1979.

History

World War II
The squadron was originally activated at Drew Field, Florida on 1 March 1943 as the 624th Bombardment Squadron, one of the four original squadrons of the 405th Bombardment Group.  It was initially equipped with Douglas A-24 Banshees and Bell P-39 Airacobras.  Although retaining the same mission and equipment, in August the squadron was renamed the 509th Fighter-Bomber Squadron.  The following month, it moved to Walterboro Army Air Field, South Carolina, where it began to fly the Republic P-47 Thunderbolts, with which it would be equipped for the rest of World War II.  On 14 February 1944, the 509th left its training base for the European Theater of Operations.

The squadron arrived at its first station in the theater, RAF Christchurch, England in early March 1944 and flew its first combat mission the following month.  It dropped the "bomber" portion of its designation in May, but retained the fighter bomber mission.  The 509th helped prepare for Operation Overlord, the invasion of Normandy, by striking military airfields, and lines of communication, particularly bridges and railroad marshalling yards.  On D-Day, it flew combat patrols in the vicinity of Brest, France, and in the following days flew armed reconnaissance missions over Normandy.

Toward the end of June, the squadron moved to Picauville Airfield, France, and for the rest of the war concentrated on providing close air support for ground forces.  It supported Operation Cobra, the breakout at Saint Lo in July with attacks on military vehicles and artillery positions.  The squadron engaged and destroyed a German armored column near Avranches, France, on 29 July 1944.  After immobilizing leading and trailing elements of the 3-mile (4.8 km) long column, the rest of the tanks and trucks were systematically destroyed with multiple sorties. Its operations from D-Day through September 1944 supporting the liberation of Belgium earned the squadron a citation in the Order of the Day of the Belgian Army.  The squadron received a Distinguished Unit Citation for action on 24 September 1944 when the 4th Armored Division experienced a counterattack by enemy forces and urgently needed air support.  Elements of the 405th Group attacked the enemy armor despite an 800-foot ceiling that forced attacks to be made from low level in the face of intense flak.  A second group element was unable to locate the tank battle because of the adverse weather, but located a reinforcing column of armor and trucks, causing major damage.  A third element attacked warehouses and other buildings in the vicinity that were being used by the enemy.

The squadron flew its last combat mission of the war on 8 May 1945. It briefly served in the occupation forces at AAF Station Straubing, but by 8 July was mostly a paper unit.  Its remaining personnel returned to the United States in October and the squadron was inactivated upon arrival at the port of embarkation.

Reactivation as a fighter bomber unit

The squadron returned to its designation as the 509th Fighter-Bomber Squadron and was activated at Godman Air Force Base, Kentucky on 1 December 1952, when it assumed the mission, personnel and F-47 Thunderbolt aircraft of the 141st Fighter-Bomber Squadron, a New Jersey Air National Guard unit that had been called to active duty for the Korean War.  However, Godman was not suitable for jet fighter operations, and in April 1953, the squadron moved to Langley Air Force Base, Virginia as the Air Force prepared to transfer Godman to the Army.  After arriving at Langley, the squadron was able to upgrade to Republic F-84 Thunderjets, later upgrading to North American F-100 Super Sabres.  The squadron was inactivated with the rest of the 405th Wing in July 1958.

Air defense in the Pacific

The squadron was redesignated the 509th Fighter-Interceptor Squadron and activated in April 1959, when the 405th Fighter Wing replaced the 6200th Air Base Wing at Clark Air Base, Philippines.  The squadron assumed the mission, personnel and North American F-86D Sabres of the 26th Fighter-Interceptor Squadron, which was simultaneously inactivated. The following year, the squadron replaced its Sabres with Convair F-102 Delta Daggers, which were armed with AIM-4 Falcons and equipped with data link for intercept control.

The squadron mission was air defense of the Philippines, but as the only USAF interceptor unit in the southern Pacific, the squadron was called on to deploy elements to other countries. One of the earliest deployments was to Don Muang Airport outside Bangkok, Thailand of six F-102s under Operation Bell Tone. It also deployed to Taiwan.  In March 1962, the American radar unit at Pleiku Air Base began to detect unknown aircraft entering South Vietnamese airspace.  In response, the squadron sent a detachment of four "Deuces" to Tan Son Nhut Airport, near Saigon.  One was a two-seat TF-102, which proved better at intercepting the slow-moving aircraft used for training to simulate the intruders.  As a result, more TF-102s were drawn from Fifth and Thirteenth Air Forces for the detachment.  In July, the squadron's planes were replaced by Navy Douglas AD-5Q Q-Birds, and the Air Force and Navy began a series of six-week rotations for air defense in Vietnam.

The Gulf of Tonkin Incident resulted in another deployment of squadron interceptors to Vietnam.  On 5 August 1964, six F-102s deployed from Clark to Da Nang Air Base in the northern part of South Vietnam. By the end of 1966, the squadron was maintaining six planes on alert at Bien Hoa Air Base in addition to the six at Da Nang, with another ten located in Thailand at Don Muang and at Udorn Royal Thai Air Force Base.  After June 1966, the detachments in Thailand were maintained jointly with the 64th Fighter-Interceptor Squadron, which had been activated as a second F-102 unit at Clark. Fourteen aircraft were kept on five-minute alert, while the rest were expected to respond within an hour.  Missions included providing top cover for Boeing B-52 Stratofortresses engaged in Operation Arc Light missions.  This alert commitment lasted until December 1969, and 15 F-102s were lost during Southeast Asia operations. The squadron's detachments in Thailand were closed under Projects Banner Star and Banner Sun and their planes returned to Clark. The squadron became nonoperational on 17 July 1970 and was inactivated a week later with the phaseout of the F-102 in the Pacific.

Tactical fighter operations in Europe
The squadron was again redesignated, this time as the 509th Tactical Fighter Squadron and activated at RAF Woodbridge, England in October 1979 as the 81st Tactical Fighter Wing changed its mission to close air support and air interdiction as it equipped with Fairchild Republic A-10 Thunderbolt IIs and expanded from three to six operational squadrons. Four months later, the squadron moved to the 81st Wing's main base at RAF Bentwaters.  The squadron participated in joint and combined exercises with American and British ground forces and periodically deployed to designated wartime operating bases at RAF Ahlhorn and Norvenich Air Base in Germany.

In June 1988, the squadron moved to RAF Alconbury, where it was assigned to the 10th Tactical Fighter Wing.  The squadron continued the same mission until inactivating in late December 1992 as the US reduced its presence in the United Kingdom.

Lineage
 Constituted as the 624th Bombardment Squadron (Dive) on 4 February 1943
 Activated on 1 March 1943
 Redesignated 509th Fighter-Bomber Squadron on 10 August 1943
 Redesignated 509th Fighter Squadron on 30 May 1944
 Inactivated on 15 October 1945
 Redesignated 509th Fighter-Bomber Squadron on 15 October 1952
 Activated on 1 December 1952
 Inactivated on 1 July 1958
 Redesignated 509th Fighter-Interceptor Squadron on 11 March 1959
 Activated on 9 April 1959
 Inactivated on 24 July 1970
 Redesignated 509th Tactical Fighter Squadron on 30 April 1979
 Activated on 1 October 1979
 Inactivated on 30 December 1992

Assignments
 405th Bombardment Group (later 405th Fighter-Bomber Group, 405th Fighter Group), 1 March 1943 – 15 October 1945
 405th Fighter-Bomber Group, 1 December 1952
 405th Fighter-Bomber Wing, 8 October 1957 – 1 July 1958
 405th Fighter Wing, 9 April 1959 – 24 July 1970 (attached to 23d Air Base Group 5 August 1964 – 8 July 1965, 6252d Tactical Fighter Wing 8 July–November 1965)
 81st Tactical Fighter Wing, 1 October 1979
 10th Tactical Fighter Wing, 1 September 1988 – 30 December 1992

Stations

 Drew Field, Florida, 1 March 1943
 Walterboro Army Air Field, South Carolina, 14 September 1943 – 14 February 1944
 RAF Christchurch (AAF-416), England, 7 March–22 June 1944
 Picauville Airfield (A-8), France, 29 June 1944
 St-Dizier Airfield (A-64), France, c. 13 September 1944
 Ophoven Airfield (Y-32), Belgium, 6 February 1945
 Kitzingen Airfield (R-6), Germany, 23 April 1945
 AAF Station Straubing (R-68), Germany, 8 May–2 July 1945
 Camp Shanks, New York, 14–15 October 1945
 Godman Air Force Base, Kentucky, 1 December 1952

 Langley Air Force Base, Virginia, 17 April 1953 – 1 July 1958
 Clark Air Base, Philippines, 9 April 1959 – 24 July 1970; Deployed to Kung Kuan Air Base, Taiwan, 1 August – 30 September 1961
 RAF Woodbridge, England, 1 October 1979
 RAF Bentwaters, England, 1 February 1980
 RAF Alconbury, England, 1 June 1988 – 30 December 1992

Aircraft

 Douglas A-24 Banshee, 1943
 Bell P-39 Airacobra, 1943
 Republic P-47 Thunderbolt (later F-47), 1943–1945, 1952
 Republic F-84 Thunderjet, 1953–1956
 North American F-100 Super Sabre, 1956–1958
 North American F-86D Sabre, 1959–1960
 Convair F-102 Delta Dagger, 1960–1970
 Fairchild Republic A-10 Thunderbolt II, 1979–1992

Awards and campaigns

See also

 List of United States Air Force fighter squadrons
 List of F-86 Sabre units
 List of F-100 units of the United States Air Force

References

Notes
 Explanatory notes

 Citations

Bibliography

External links
 Poss, Don. "Yates, Ron: Vietnam Remembrances." vspa.com. Retrieved: 25 March 2011.

Fighter squadrons of the United States Air Force
Military units and formations of the United States in the Cold War